Hiiaka is the larger, outer moon of the trans-Neptunian dwarf planet Haumea. It is named after one of the daughters of Haumea, Hiiaka, the patron goddess of the Big Island of Hawaii. Assuming its estimated diameter of over 300 km is accurate, it may be the fourth- or fifth-largest known moon of a Trans-Neptunian object, after Pluto I Charon, Eris I Dysnomia, Orcus I Vanth, and possibly Varda I Ilmarë and Salacia I Actaea.

Discovery
Hiiaka was the first satellite discovered around Haumea. It was discovered on 26 January 2005 and nicknamed "Rudolph" by the discovery team before being assigned an official name.

Physical characteristics

Size and brightness 
To put this in perspective, if Hiʻiaka were in the asteroid belt, it would be larger than all but the four largest asteroids, after 1 Ceres, 2 Pallas, 4 Vesta, and 10 Hygiea. In spite of its relatively large size, however, lightcurve studies suggest that Hiʻiaka is not a gravitationally collapsed spheroid; they further suggest that Hiʻiaka is not tidally locked and has a rotation period of about 9.8 hours.

Mass 
The mass of Hiiaka is estimated to be  using precise relative astrometry from the Hubble Space Telescope and Keck Telescope and applying 3-body, point-mass model to the Haumean system.

Spectrum and composition 
The near infrared spectrum of Hiiaka is dominated by water-ice absorption bands, which means that its surface is made mainly of water ice. The presence of the band centered at  indicates that the surface water ice is primarily in the crystalline form. Currently it is unclear why water ice on the surface has not turned into amorphous form as would be expected due to its constant irradiation by cosmic rays.

See also
Namaka, the other moon of Haumea

Notes

References

External links
 Brown's publication describing the discovery of Hiiaka
 Paper describing the composition of Hiiaka

Moons of Haumea
Trans-Neptunian satellites
Discoveries by Michael E. Brown
Discoveries by Chad Trujillo
Discoveries by David L. Rabinowitz
Objects observed by stellar occultation